The LAPV Enok is a Light Armoured Patrol Vehicle of the Bundeswehr, mostly in use with the German Army. It is a significantly further developed Wolf SSA, based on the Mercedes-Benz G-Class.

The LAPV Enok is being manufactured by Armored Car Systems GmbH (ACS), based in Aichach, a wholly owned subsidiary of 'Gruma Commercial Vehicles' based in Derching. Important subcontractors are the companies  LeTech - Special Purpose Vehicles  (formerly Lennartz Technik) in Welzheim and the Austrian Magna Steyr based in Graz.

History
A first batch of 247 vehicles has been ordered by the Bundeswehr, with deliveries scheduled to be carried out between 2008 and 2013.

Another batch of 84 improved Enoks (Enok 6.1) with increased armor and weight (=) were ordered in January 2015. 49 of them are determined for the Kommando Spezialkräfte

Im August 2018, the German Federal Police ordered modified Enok 6.1s along with remote controlled weapon stations as protected vehicles for airport security tasks, denominated Geschütztes Einsatzfahrzeug 2 - (GEF2).

Design
It features protection according to NATO STANAG 4569 Level 2, against rifle fire, land mines, and improvised explosive devices. The Enok was especially designed to be deployed in harsh terrain and bad weather situations.

Operators

 Finnish Police ordered 15 vehicles to be delivered between 2018-2019.

 Federal Armed Forces: Over 250 in use.
 Army: Special Operation Forces (KSK)
 Federal Police: 28
 State police forces
 Bavarian State Police: 2 since 2020 for the Spezialeinsatzkommando
 Lower Saxony State Police: 1 vehicle

 Armed Forces of Montenegro — 6 gifted from Germany in September 2018.

See also 
Mercedes-Benz G-Class, for info on the Wolf vehicle

References

External links 
 Behörden Spiegel - First deliveries for the German Army
 www.panzerbaer.de - Website with pictures

Mercedes-Benz G-Class
Off-road vehicles
Armoured fighting vehicles of the post–Cold War period
Armoured cars
Armoured fighting vehicles of Germany
Post–Cold War military vehicles of Germany
Military light utility vehicles
Military vehicles introduced in the 2000s